{{DISPLAYTITLE:C3H8O2}}
The molecular formula C3H8O2 may refer to:

 Dimethoxymethane
 2-Methoxyethanol
 Propanediol
 1,2-Propanediol (propylene glycol)
 1,3-Propanediol (trimethylene glycol)
 1,1-Propanediol (geminal diol)
 2,2-Propanediol (geminal diol)